The Cassiopeia Dwarf (also known as Andromeda VII) is a dwarf spheroidal galaxy about 2.45 Mly away in the constellation Cassiopeia. The Cassiopeia Dwarf is part of the Local Group and a satellite galaxy of the Andromeda Galaxy (M31). In the sky, it appears behind the Milky Way's galactic plane, and so it is reddened by 0.194 magnitudes. It also has the highest metallicity out of all of them.

The Cassiopeia Dwarf was found in 1998, together with the Pegasus Dwarf, by a team of astronomers (Karachentsev and Karachentseva) in Russia and Ukraine. The Cassiopeia Dwarf and the Pegasus Dwarf are farther from M31 than its other known companion galaxies, yet still appear bound to it by gravity. Neither galaxy contains any young, massive stars or shows traces of recent star formation. Instead, both seem dominated by very old stars, with ages of up to 10 billion years. The main period of star formation occurred around 6.2 billion years ago, and 90% of the star formation in the Cassiopeia Dwarf was done by 5 billion years ago.

See also
 Andromeda's satellite galaxies

References

External links
 SEDS: Dwarf Spheroidal Galaxy Andromeda VII
 

Dwarf galaxies
Dwarf spheroidal galaxies
Local Group
Andromeda Subgroup
Cassiopeia (constellation)
Astronomical objects discovered in 1998